A statue of Sally Ride was installed outside the Cradle of Aviation Museum in Garden City, New York, in 2022.

References

2022 establishments in New York (state)
2022 sculptures
Monuments and memorials in New York (state)
Outdoor sculptures in New York (state)
Sally Ride
Sculptures of women in New York (state)
Statues in New York (state)